Asim Ali (born 18 February 1996) is a Pakistani cricketer. He made his first-class debut for Lahore Blues in the 2016–17 Quaid-e-Azam Trophy on 1 October 2016. He made his List A debut for Lahore Whites in the 2018–19 Quaid-e-Azam One Day Cup on 6 September 2018.

References

External links
 

1996 births
Living people
Pakistani cricketers
Lahore Blues cricketers
Lahore Whites cricketers
Cricketers from Lahore